GSCP may refer to:
 Goldman Sachs Capital Partners, a private equity firm
 Government Security Classifications Policy